{{DISPLAYTITLE:C7H16O3}}
The molecular formula C7H16O3 (molar mass: 148.20 g/mol, exact mass: 148.1099 u) may refer to:

 Di(propylene glycol) methyl ether
 Triethyl orthoformate 

Molecular formulas